The Ocoa Valley is a landform in central Chile located by the La Campana National Park. This valley is a locus where considerable archaeological recovery has taken place, yielding considerable finds of pre-European contact period. According to Dallman and Hogan, some of the greatest stands of the endangered Chilean Wine Palm, Jubaea chilensis are found on the slopes of La Campana that rise up from the Ocoa Valley.

See also
 Cerro La Campana
 Chilean Wine Palm

References
 Chile.com (2008) V Region: National Parks: La Campana National Park
 C. Michael Hogan (2008) Chilean Wine Palm: Jubaea chilensis, GlobalTwitcher.com, ed. N. Stromberg

Line notes

Valleys of Chile
Landforms of Valparaíso Region